Emblemariopsis dianae, the Orangeflag blenny, is a species of chaenopsid blenny found in coral reefs around Belize, in the western central Atlantic ocean. It can reach a maximum length of  fish measurement. The specific name honours Diane M. Tyler, a researcher into the behavioural ecology of blennies in the family Chaenopsidae and the wife of James Chase Tyler.

References
 Tyler, J.C. and P.A. Hastings, 2004 Emblemariopsis dianae, a new species of chaenopsid fish from the western Caribbean off Belize (Blennioidei). Aqua, Journal of Ichthyology and Aquatic Biology v. 8 (no. 2): 49–60.

dianae
Fauna of Belize
Fish described in 2004